Eumorpha typhon, the Typhon sphinx, is a moth of the family Sphingidae. The species was first described by Johann Christoph Friedrich Klug in 1836.

Distribution 
It lives from Honduras north through Mexico to southern Arizona.

Description 
The wingspan is 57–64 mm. The upperside of the wings is deep red brown with pale brown bands. Each hindwing has a pink patch along the costal margin and a triangular white spot on the outer part of the inner margin.

Biology 
Adults are on wing from June to August in the northern part of the range. Adults feed on the nectar of various flowers.

The larvae feed on various grape species. Pupation takes place in shallow soil.

References

External links

"Eumorpha typhon". Sphingidae of the Americas. Archived from the original July 12, 2012.

Eumorpha
Moths described in 1836
Taxa named by Johann Christoph Friedrich Klug